The Norfolk Chamber Music Festival, hosted in Norfolk, Connecticut, is a summer music festival. Set among the Litchfield Hills of the lower Berkshires, the Festival traces its roots to the Battell family, who started hosting summer concerts on the Norfolk town green in the 1880s. Now under the auspices of the Yale University School of Music, the Festival hosts more than 30 concerts each summer featuring professional performers and graduate music students from around the globe. Among many others, guest performers and composers over the years have included the Tokyo String Quartet, Percy Grainger, Fritz Kreisler, Midori, Pinchas Zukerman, Dave Brubeck, Jean Sibelius, Nicholas Laucella and Sergei Rachmaninoff.

History

Robbins Battell (1819–1895), the seventh son of a wealthy Norfolk, CT family, was a generous patron of music, as well as, a skilled amateur flutist and composer. After graduating from Yale University in 1839, he returned to Norfolk to manage the family business enterprises. This reached New York City and beyond and generated vast wealth that allowed him to become an important philanthropist. Passionate about the musical life of the community, he created a singing school and conducted concerts of the Litchfield County Musical Association in Norfolk and neighboring Winsted. He conducted a performance of the Hallelujah Chorus to celebrate the centennial of the county in 1851. As a composer, he wrote hymns and choral arrangements, and set a great deal of poetry to music. Robbins was also concerned about the economy of his hometown. To attract visitors and tourists, he built a hotel. Beginning in the 1880s he financed a week-long series of concerts on the green. This concert series became what is now known as the Norfolk Festival.

Robbins’ daughter, Ellen (1851–1939), continued her father's legacy of bringing music to Norfolk. In 1895 she married Carl Stoeckel (1858–1925), son of Gustave Stoeckel, who was awarded the first Doctor of Music degree at Yale. After their marriage, in memory of Ellen’s father, Robbins, Carl and Ellen started the Litchfield County Choral Union which continues to perform at the Norfolk Festival to this day. Under Carl and Ellen, Norfolk soon became the first internationally known classical music festival in America. The Stoeckels assumed the entire expense of the concerts which took place on their estate. These concerts rapidly became extravagant affairs with parties and picnics, and were among the most popular summer social events in New England. They recruited a 70-piece orchestra of musicians from the New York Philharmonic and Metropolitan Opera, and paid for a special train to transport the instrumentalists to the Litchfield Hills.

In 1906, to accommodate the ever-growing crowds at the festival, the couple built a concert hall known as the Music Shed. Carl and Ellen Stoeckel’s philanthropy extended to presenting the festivals and concerts free of charge. They sought no public recognition for their role. Ellen listened to the concerts from a secluded window above the Music Shed stage while Carl quietly entered from the side and stood in the doorway. They commissioned new works from many of the leading composers of their time and invited them to conduct their own premieres. Sibelius, for example, composed his tone poem The Oceanides for the Stoeckels and conducted it in the Music Shed during his only trip to the United States on June 4, 1915. The autograph manuscript is now in the Music Library at Yale University.

The Yale School of Music in Norfolk

When Ellen Battell Stoeckel died in 1939 with no surviving children, she stipulated in her will that her estate was to be used in perpetuity for the “benefit and development of the School of Music of Yale University and for extending said University’s courses in music, art, and literature.”  The Yale Summer School of Music was established in 1941. Since that time, the Norfolk Chamber Music Festival has played host to thousands of emerging young professional musicians.  Today the Festival offers intensive tuition-free programs each summer to approximately eighty students in chamber music, new music and choral repertoire.

The Music Shed

Designed by New York architect, E.K. Rossiter, the Music Shed existed first as a separate prototype structure modelled after Steinway Hall in New York. A test concert was given in 1904. The success of the experimental hall led to the construction of the Music Shed which was built for the Litchfield County Choral Union and opened in 1906. The Shed had to be enlarged due to the number of Choir and audience members, and after an expansion in 1910 it could accommodate a Choir of 425 and an audience of 1,500. The Shed is built of cedar and lined with redwood that was hand-picked and imported from California. The buildings extraordinary acoustics, not to mention the exquisite glow of its interior can be attributed to the redwood. Initially tickets were sold, but the Stoeckels eventually decided that events in the Music Shed would be by invitation only.  Movie stars, politicians, high society and professional musicians began to covet invitations from the prestigious Battells. By the beginning of the First World War, the Music Shed was one of the country’s most sought-out venues and a premier concert hall in New England.

Distinguished performers at Norfolk

Frederick Stock
Leopold Damrosch
Lillian Nordica
Emma Eames
Louise Homer
Frieda Hempel
Alma Gluck
Fritz Kreisler
Nicholas Laucella (premiered his Whitehouse - Impressions of Norfolk)<ref>[https://books.google.com/books?id=x-w6AQAAMAAJ&dq=Nicola+Laucella&pg=PA184 The Musical Courier  June 21, 1917 p. 36 Critical review of the premier of Nicola Laucella's composition "Whitehouse - Impressions of Norfolk & quotes from New York Times & The New York Tribune on books.google.com]</ref>Music News Vol 12, No. 9  Chicago, February 27, 1920, p26 "The Metropolitan Opera Company and Nicola Laucella on books.google.com
Nicholas McGegan
Horatio Parker
George Chadwick
Aldo Parisot
Maud Powell
Sergei Rachmaninov
János Starker
Ralph Vaughan Williams (conducted premiere of Pastoral Symphony)
Jean Sibelius (conducted the premiere of The Oceanides)
Max Bruch
Samuel Coleridge-Taylor
Dave Brubeck
Percy Grainger
Richard Stoltzman
Frederica von Stade
Midori
Dawn Upshaw
Pinchas Zukerman
Cleveland Quartet
Tokyo String Quartet
Emerson String Quartet
Emanuel Ax

 References 

Further reading
Anne Havemeyer & R. Dance. The Magnificent Battells'' (Norfolk: Norfolk Hist. Soc., 2006)
A. Falk. "A Century of Music in the Shed, 1906-2006." (Norfolk: Norfolk Chamber Music Festival Program Book, 2006)
http://www.yalealumnimagazine.com/issues/02_10/old_yale.html
http://music.yale.edu
http://www.tokyoquartet.com
Ellen Battell Stoeckel Last Will and Testament

External links 
 
 

Music festivals in Connecticut
Chamber music festivals
Classical music festivals in the United States